Buttermilk Flat Schoolhouse No. 22 is a historic one-room school building located at Orleans in Jefferson County, New York. It is a -story, rectangular (20 feet by 30 feet) clapboard-sided frame structure built about 1850.  It was last used as a school in 1932.

It was listed on the National Register of Historic Places in 1996.

References

One-room schoolhouses in New York (state)
Schoolhouses in the United States
School buildings on the National Register of Historic Places in New York (state)
School buildings completed in 1850
Buildings and structures in Jefferson County, New York
National Register of Historic Places in Jefferson County, New York